Jari-Matti Latvala (born 3 April 1985) is a Finnish rally driver who has competed in the World Rally Championship (WRC). His co-driver for most of his career was Miikka Anttila, who co-drove for Latvala between the 2003 Rallye Deutschland and 2019 Rally Catalunya. He is well known for his aggressive driving style, which earns him many plaudits, and comparisons to the late Colin McRae. With 18 event victories in the WRC, he is the most successful driver to not have won a championship. Latvala is also the driver with the most World Rally starts in the sport which he achieved in 2019, 17 years after his debut.

Starting in 2021, he served as the team principal of Toyota Gazoo Racing WRT, replacing Tommi Mäkinen.

Career
Latvala began driving when he was eight years old, after receiving a Ford Escort from his father Jari Latvala, also a rally driver and 1994 national champion in the Group N class. At the age of ten, Latvala started practicing with an Opel Ascona on a frozen lake.

2000s

Latvala's first world rally was the 2002 Rally Great Britain at the age of 17. He finished in 17th position with a Mitsubishi Lancer Evolution VI. In 2003, Latvala competed in four WRC events with a Ford Focus WRC, finishing tenth at the Acropolis Rally, 17th at the Rallye Deutschland, 14th at the Neste Oil Rally Finland and tenth at the Rally Great Britain.

In 2004, Latvala mostly competed with an S1600 class Junior World Rally Championship car. His best overall result in the World Rally Championship was 21st with a Group N Subaru Impreza WRX STI at the Tour de Corse. In the 2005 season, Latvala competed in nine world rallies; six with the Group N Impreza and three with a World Rally Car. His best overall result was 16th, which he managed three times; at the Swedish Rally with a Toyota Corolla WRC and at the Tour de Corse and the Rally d'Italia Sardegna with the Impreza.

2006–2007: Stobart Ford

In 2006, Latvala competed in 11 world rallies. He drove the Subaru Impreza WRX STI in six, a Ford Focus WRC in four and a Toyota Corolla WRC at his home event, the Neste Oil Rally Finland. His best results came in the last three rallies. At the Telstra Rally Australia, he won the Production Car World Rally Championship (PCWRC) class, and finished sixth overall. At the Propecia Rally New Zealand, he finished eighth overall and also won the PCWRC. With the Focus WRC, he recorded his career-best result by finishing fourth at the last event of the season, the Rally Great Britain. Points from these rallies then placed Latvala 13th overall in the drivers' championship.

In 2007, Latvala competed a full 16-event programme for Stobart M-Sport Ford with Matthew Wilson and Henning Solberg as teammates. He started the season with retirements in Monte Carlo and Sweden. At the Rally Norway, Latvala was in contention for his first podium place, but had to settle for fifth after a 90 seconds time penalty. He did, however, take his first stage win on SS5. Latvala later took his first podium at the 2007 Rally Ireland. At the last rally of the season, Rally GB, he lost 10 minutes on the last stage of day one due to windscreen wiper failure, but went on to win ten of the remaining 11 stages under the SupeRally rules, finishing 10th overall.

2008: Ford's factory team

In 2008, Latvala joined Ford's factory team as a number two driver, partnering Mikko Hirvonen and replacing Marcus Grönholm who had announced his retirement from the WRC at the end of 2007. The opening round of the season wasn't lucky for the young Finn – he suffered a puncture after cutting a corner too deep on the very first stage and lost even more time because of a non-fully operative pneumatic wrench. Latvala continued to fight and was ninth overall before SS12, but he made another mistake there and heavily damaged the front left suspension in his Focus, forcing himself to retire for good. At the second rally of the season, 2008 Swedish Rally, he had good pace from the beginning – he won all regular special stages on day one, pulling away from the runner-up spot slowly, but consistently. He later had some problems and wasn't the fastest on any of the remaining stages, but managed to keep his position throughout the rally. The 22-year-old therefore took his first WRC win to become the youngest winner in the history of the World Rally Championship. The previous record was held by Henri Toivonen who was 24 years and 86 days old when he won the 1980 RAC Rally. For his performance during the Swedish rally Latvala was given the Abu Dhabi Spirit Of The Rally award.
At the first gravel event of the season, the 2008 Rally México, despite officially claiming no intentions to win the event, he was the fastest driver on the first two stages and was leading the rally throughout the first day, pulling out from the current World Rally Champion, Sébastien Loeb. Unfortunately for the young Finn, the turbo in his Ford Focus was malfunctioning during the second day, making his car uncompetitive. This, along with having to be the opening driver on the stages 9–16, having to sweep the track of the loose gravel, cost him a substantial amount of time and Latvala finished the rally third.

2009 season

For 2009 the expectation was for Latvala to progress in his performance as number two driver for Ford's factory team. However the start of the season became a big disappointment for the team, as Latvala went off the road in three of the first four rallies of the year. In Portugal, he and his co-driver Miikka Anttila were lucky to escape injury in the most serious crash in Latvala's career. They went off the road on a left-hand bend and rolled 17 times, 150m down a steep hill, and finally came to rest against a tree. Latvala had specifically been focusing to combat his driver weaknesses going into this rally, so the accident put some extra pressure on him for the future, although he also admitted that he would fully understand if the team did not require his services because of his erratic reputation. However, after a consistent, steady drive in Argentina, Latvala went on to take his second WRC win of his career on Rally Sardinia ahead of teammate Mikko Hirvonen. He led from beginning to end, hence driving as first car on the road on both day two and three.

2010 season

Latvala remained with the Ford factory team for 2010. Following his many crashes in 2009, he now had the official position of number two driver whereas in the previous year there was no official distinction between him and his teammate Mikko Hirvonen. After Round 1 in Sweden, Latvala came 3rd. In Mexico, Jari-Matti came 5th and in Round 3 - Rally Jordan, he came 2nd. He crashed on stage 10 in Turkey and he took a dramatic win in New-Zealand. In Round 6, Rally of Portugal, he crashed out and in Bulgaria he was 6th. In this year's 8th round, the Finnish Rally, he claimed his second win of the season, while his teammate Mikko Hirvonen crashed out. Latvala was now ahead of his teammate by 19 points in 4th.
After his fourth place in Germany, the third place in Japan and the two fourth places in France and Spain, Latvala managed to finish the season on the podium in Wales. His third place brought him the second place in the overall classification behind record-champion Loeb.

2012 season
For 2012 Latvala was promoted to Ford's number one after the departure of Hirvonen to Rival's Citroen Total. For the first round in Monte-Carlo Jari-Mati-Latvala took the first stages wins before going off the road at the last stage of day 1, without having rally 2 rules in the event(a.k.a. formidably known as superrally rules) he retired. Round 2 in Sweden and Latvala took his first win of the season and the first as Ford's number one. Mexico saw another retirement of Latvala, and it continued to round 4 in Vodafone Rally de Portugal. Recently Latvala was injured during the testing for the 5th round in Argentina, he is due to be replaced by Prodrive's Dani Sordo, but should be able to compete by the next round in Greece.

2013-2016

For 2013, Latvala signed a contract with the new Volkswagen WRC team, announced on October 17. He described Ford's decision to end its works programme as the key factor that influenced his decision to change teams. The Finn claimed a win at Greece, and collected seven podiums in 13 races, ranking third in points teammate Ogier and Ford driver Neuville.

In 2014, Latvala won four races at Sweden, Argentina, Finland and Alsace, while collecting eight podiums in 13 races. Therefore, he finished runner-up in the overall standings, behind Ogier who claimed eight wins. In 2015, the driver got three wins at Portugal, Finland and Corsica, while claiming four runner-up finishes. Again he ranked second in points, behind Volkswagen teammate Ogier who won eight races. In 2016, Latvala won at Mexico, and finished second in Italy and Finland, but finished sixth in the overall standings.

2017-2020

Following Volkswagen's withdrawal from the WRC, Latvala and co-driver Miikka Anttila joined the Toyota Gazoo factory team for the 2017 season. He claimed a win at Sweden, second place finishes at Monte Carlo and Italy, and a fourth place finish at Corsica. He finished fourth in points, behind Ford drivers Ogier and Ott Tänak, and Hyundai driver Neuville.

The 2018 season started well with third place in Monaco, and ended competitively with 4 podiums in the last six events, and a win on the final round of the year, Kennards Hire Rally Australia. This was his first victory in 21 months, having made the best of the tricky conditions of the event.  He finished fourth in the 2018 driver championship.

For 2019, Jari-Matti remained with the Toyota Gazoo Racing Team. He scored a podium in two events; third place at his home rally in Finland, after colliding with a loose rock during the event. Then third place again at the next round in Germany. Latvala finished the season in 7th position, his lowest since 2007.

The 2020 driver announcements meant Jari-Matti was struggling to find a seat with Toyota. Failure to secure a deal with M-Sport Ford forced him to look at other options. Latvala is confirmed for two events, Sweden and Finland, in a privately-run Toyota Yaris WRC, while looking to finance a further three events at rallying's top level. He is registered under the Latvala Motorsport banner, with Juho Hänninen confirmed as co-driver.

2021 - present
On the 18th of December 2020, it was announced Jari-Matti Latvala will become Team Principal at Toyota Gazoo Racing in 2021, to replace Tommi Mäkinen.

Other ventures

Latvala Motorsport
Jari-Matti Latvala also manages the private enterprise Latvala Motorsport with his wife and family, administered from a custom-built location in Tuuri. This is home to a museum of rally cars from his personal collection, memorabilia and official merchandise, a rentable business auditorium, and a rally simulator. The facility is open to the public during the summer months.

Personal life
In 2008, Latvala moved from Finland to Monaco. In 2020, he relocated to Tuuri, Finland.

Latvala was engaged to Finnish celebrity Maisa Torppa from 2017 to 2019.

WRC victories
{|class="wikitable"
!  # 
! Event
! Season
! Co-driver
! Car
|-
| 1
|  57th Uddeholm Swedish Rally
| 2008
|  Miikka Anttila
| Ford Focus RS WRC 07
|-
| 2
|  6º Rally d'Italia Sardegna
| 2009
|  Miikka Anttila
| Ford Focus RS WRC 09
|-
| 3
|  40th Rally New Zealand
| 2010
|  Miikka Anttila
| Ford Focus RS WRC 09
|-
| 4
|  60º Rally Finland
| 2010
|  Miikka Anttila
| Ford Focus RS WRC 09
|-
| 5
|  67th Wales Rally GB
| 2011
|  Miikka Anttila
| Ford Fiesta RS WRC
|-
| 6
|  60th Rally Sweden
| 2012
|  Miikka Anttila
| Ford Fiesta RS WRC
|-
| 7
|  68th Wales Rally GB
| 2012
|  Miikka Anttila
| Ford Fiesta RS WRC
|-
| 8
|  59th Acropolis Rally
| 2013
|  Miikka Anttila
| Volkswagen Polo R WRC
|-
|9
|  62nd Rally Sweden
| 2014
|  Miikka Anttila
| Volkswagen Polo R WRC
|-
|10
|  34th Rally Argentina
| 2014
|  Miikka Anttila
| Volkswagen Polo R WRC
|-
|11
|  64th Rally Finland
| 2014
|  Miikka Anttila
| Volkswagen Polo R WRC
|-
| 12
|  Rallye de France-Alsace
| 2014
|  Miikka Anttila
| Volkswagen Polo R WRC
|-
| 13
|  49° Vodafone Rally de Portugal
| 2015
|  Miikka Anttila
| Volkswagen Polo R WRC
|-
|14
|  65th Rally Finland
| 2015
|  Miikka Anttila
| Volkswagen Polo R WRC
|-
|15
|  58ème Tour de Corse – Rallye de France
| 2015
|  Miikka Anttila
| Volkswagen Polo R WRC
|-
|16
|  30° Rally Guanajuato México
| 2016
|  Miikka Anttila
| Volkswagen Polo R WRC
|-
|17
|  65th Rally Sweden
| 2017
|  Miikka Anttila
| Toyota Yaris WRC
|-
|18
|  27th Rally Australia
| 2018
|  Miikka Anttila
| Toyota Yaris WRC
|-
|}

Results

WRC results

JWRC results

PWRC results

References

External links

 Official website 
 Latvala Motorsport
 Profile at WRC.com

1985 births
Finnish rally drivers
Living people
People from Töysä
World Rally Championship drivers
Finnish expatriates in Monaco
World Rally Championship people
Sportspeople from South Ostrobothnia
Toyota Gazoo Racing drivers
Volkswagen Motorsport drivers
M-Sport drivers